The 1967 KFK competitions in Ukraine were part of the 1967 Soviet KFK competitions that were conducted in the Soviet Union. It was 4th season of the KFK in Ukraine since its introduction in 1964.

First stage

Group 1
 Metalist Sevastopol
 Tekstylnyk Kherson
 Zenit Mykolaiv
 Avanhard Kerch
 Molot Yevpatoria

Group 2
 Pryladyst Mukacheve
 Khimik Kalush
 Lokomotyv Kovel
 Vymiryuvach Lviv

Group 3
 Avanhard Rovenky
 Kharchovyk Sumy
 Lokomotyv Kupyansk
 Suputnyk Poltava

Group 4
 Kolhospnyk Buchach
 Avanhard Pryluky
 Podillia Kamianets-Podilskyi
 Avtomobilist Bila Tserkva
 Avanhard Novohrad-Volynskyi

Group 5
 Avanhard Vilnohirsk
 Tytan Zaporizhia
 Lokomotyv Smila
 Shakhtar Donetsk (amateurs)
 Spartak Kirovohrad

Group 6
 Temp Kyiv
 Kolhospnyk Hayeve (Vinnytsia Oblast)
 Taksomotor Odesa
 Tekstylnyk Rivne
 Vostok Chernivtsi

Final
Final stage was taking place on 24 October – 1 November 1967 in cities of Rovenky and Sverdlovsk. 

First place match: Avanhard Rovenky – Avanhard Vilnohirsk 2–0

Promotion
Three of KFK teams were promoted to the 1968 Ukrainian Class B.
 FC Avanhard Rovenky
 FC Prylad Mukacheve as FC Karpaty Mukachevo
 FC Podillia Kamianets-Podilskyi

Also, to the Class B were promoted following teams that did not participate in the KFK competitions:
 FC Prohres Berdychiv (last season KFK participant)
 FC Shakhtar Chervonohrad
 FC Shakhtar Novovolynsk (last season KFK participant)
 FC Ugolyok Krasnoarmiysk
 FC Shakhtar Sverdlovsk

References

Ukrainian Football Amateur League seasons
KFK